A liftershalte or liftplaats (in the Dutch language) is a spot (halte means stop, like in bushalte), marked by an official sign, where a hitchhiker (lifter) can easily be picked up by  car drivers. In the Netherlands these spots can be found at the following places (2018):

 Amsterdam: at the Prins Bernhardplein before NS Station Amsterdam Amstel (pass the bus stop), road that leads  to the ramp of the S112 of the A10. (direction A1 and A2).
 Groningen: at the Emmaviaduct, the road to the A28, 200 meter westwards of the Centraal Station (richting Assen). Since 2017: at Europaweg nearby Damsterdiep (direction Germany).
 Sneek and Heeg: local liftershaltes connecting these places.
 Utrecht ramp of the Waterlinieweg near Galgenwaard stadium (north-bound A27 and A28 and south-bound A12, A2 and A27).
 Zoetermeer: at the bus stop Pruimengaarde on the Australieweg. Combined bus stop/hitchhiking spot eastwards A2 to Utrecht. And at the bus stop Meerzichtlaan on the Afrikaweg. Combined bus stop/hitchhiking spot directions The Hague, Rotterdam, Delft.

In the past there were also liftershaltes in:
 Amsterdam: N200 direction Haarlem
 The Hague: next to the Malieveld, at the beginning of the A12 (direction Utrecht). Officially doesn't exist anymore: sign has gone. But location is still good for hitchhiking. 
 Enschede: on Westerval, at the Parkweg (direction A1), receded 2006. 
 Maastricht: at the beginning of the A2 near the soccer stadium De Geusselt situated on a very good location to hitchhike to (Viaductweg x N2/A2) (direction Eindhoven) and the A79 (direction Heerlen), receded in 2012. 
 Leeuwarden: reportedly had an official hitch-hiking spot
 Nijmegen: at the Graafseweg (direction Venlo and 's-Hertogenbosch), receded 2016, at the verkeersplein near the Waalbrug {direction Arnhem}.

References

External links
 Hitchhiking in the Netherlands
 Hitchwiki about the Netherlands
 Liftershalte.info Google-maps application with hitchhiking points all over the world

Hitchhiking

he:טרמפיאדה